The Aznon Palladium is a full-size luxury car, based on the ram pickup truck  under the Italian brand luxury brand Aznom from 2020.

Overview 

The Palladium was unveiled in 2020. Designed by Marcello Meregalli, the Palladium was planned to be the successor of the Ram based sedan, the ‘Aznom Atulux’. It is 5,960 millimetres long, making it a full-size SUV/Limousine/Sedan. Due to the amount of time each Aznom Palladium takes to build (eight months), Marcello Meregalli said there will only be 10 units planned, with the first sale being a UAE businessman.

Design 
The Palladium is a full-size ultra luxury crossover/sedan, or can be classified as a ‘hyper’ limousine. It has Ram-like headlights, with near-connecting clear taillights. It is one of the largest luxury SUVs/sedans to ever be built. It blends elements of the Bentley Flying Spur, the Rolls-Royce Phantom, and the Lamborghini Urus in its design.

Name origination 
The Aznom Palladium got its name from the chemical element of atomic number 46, a very rare silver metal meant to be resembling platinum.

Reception 
Many famous car websites, such as Drive, WhichCar?, CNET, and various others give the car’s exterior negative reception, some say it has a deformed sedan shape. Though hotcars.com  agrees that the Palladium’s interior has a range of ultra-luxury features such as large, comfortable seats, with plenty of space for the passengers, essential to the comfortability of the passengers. Hidden drawers and compartments provide a range of luxuriousness, comfortability and convenience.

References

External links

 

Cars introduced in 2020
2020s cars
Full-size vehicles
Crossover sport utility vehicles
Rear-wheel-drive vehicles
All-wheel-drive vehicles